The 2018–2019 season was Sarajevo's 70th season in existence, and their 25th consecutive season in the top flight of Bosnian football, the Premier League of BiH. Besides competing in the Premier League, the team competed in the National Cup and the qualifications for UEFA Europa League. The season covers the period from 25 June 2018 to 24 June 2019.

In that season Sarajevo won the double title, winning both the league and the cup. The club qualified to the 2019–20 UEFA Champions League qualifying rounds as well. The season was also manager Husref Musemić's third at the club.

Squad information

First-team squad

From youth squad

Transfers

Transfers in

Transfers out

Loans in

Loans out

Kit

Friendlies

Pre-season

Mid-season

Competitions

Overview

Premier League

League table

Results summary

Results by round

Matches

Cup of Bosnia and Herzegovina

Round of 32

Round of 16

Quarter-finals

Semi-finals

Final

UEFA Europa League

First qualifying round

Second qualifying round

Statistics

Squad appearances and goals

|-
! colspan="14" style="background:#dcdcdc; text-align:center"|Goalkeepers

|-
! colspan="14" style="background:#dcdcdc; text-align:center"|Defenders

|-
! colspan="14" style="background:#dcdcdc; text-align:center"|Midfielders

|-
! colspan="14" style="background:#dcdcdc; text-align:center"|Forwards

|-
! colspan=14 style=background:#dcdcdc; text-align:center|Players who have made an appearance this season but have left the club

|}
Number after the "+" sign represents the number of games player started the game on the bench and was substituted on.

Goalscorers

Hat-tricks

(H) – Home ; (A) – Away

Clean sheets

Awards

Player of the Month (by Optika Salihbegović)

Ismir Pintol Trophy

Premier League Player of the Year

Premier League Goalkeeper of the Year

Premier League Manager of the Year

Kristalnih 11

Player of the Year

Manager of the Year

Young Player of the Year

Premier League Team of the Year

References

External links

FK Sarajevo seasons
Sarajevo